Helena Catt, from the UK, was a New Zealand public servant and is an expert in electoral practice. She was the first female chief executive of the New Zealand Electoral Commission from 2004 to 2009 and was a professor in the Department of Political Studies, University of Auckland.

She was also part of the New Zealand Productivity Commission and during her tenure had a series of publications including "Are Commissions Representative?: The Composition of Commissions of Inquiry created in New Zealand since 1970".

Dr. Catt holds an MA (Hons) in Modern History and Politics from Edinburgh University and a PhD (on tactical voting) from the London School of Economics.

She was the lead of the International Election Expert Research Team, observing the Catalan Referendum in 2017.

Selected works 
Catt, Helena. "Book Review: David M. Farrell and lan McAllister, The Australian Electoral System: Origins, Variations and Consequences (Sydney: University of New South Wales Press, 2006)."  Political Science, 58:2, 90-91. 2006.
Catt, Helena. "Are Commissions Representative?: The Composition of Commissions of Inquiry created in New Zealand since 1970." Political Science, 57:1, 77-87. 2005.
Catt, Helena and Murphy, Michael.  "What voice for the people? categorising methods of public consultation." Australian Journal of Political Science, 38:3, 407-421, 2003.
Catt, Helena. "The New Zealand Election of 27 November 1999." Australian Journal of Political Science,  35:2, 299-304, 2000.
Catt, Helena. "Are demands for a ‘politics of presence’ detected by the ‘democratic audit'?." Commonwealth & Comparative Politics, 37:1, 56-70, 1999.
Catt, Helena. Democracy in Practice. Routledge, New York, 1999.
Catt, Helena, Harris, Paul and Roberts, Nigel S.  Voter ́s  Choice:Electoral  Change in New  Zealand?. Dunmore  Press, Palmerston  North,  1992.

References

External links
 

Living people
Alumni of the University of Edinburgh
Alumni of the London School of Economics
New Zealand public servants
New Zealand women academics
Year of birth missing (living people)
New Zealand political scientists
Women political scientists